The Vietnamese Fatherland Front is an umbrella group of mass movements in Vietnam aligned with the Communist Party of Vietnam forming the Vietnamese government. It was founded in February 1977 by the merger of the Vietnamese Fatherland Front of North Vietnam and two Viet Cong groups, the National Liberation Front of South Vietnam and the Alliance of National, Democratic, and Peace Forces. It is an amalgamation of many smaller groups, including the Communist Party itself. Other groups that participated in the establishment of the Front were the Vietnam General Confederation of Labour, the Ho Chi Minh Communist Youth Union ( the Ho Chi Minh Youth) and the Ho Chi Minh Young Pioneer Organization. It also included the Democratic Party of Vietnam and Socialist Party of Vietnam, until they disbanded in 1988. It also incorporates some officially sanctioned religious groups.

The Front is described by the Vietnamese government as "the political base of people's power." It is intended to have a significant role in society, promoting "national solidarity" and "unity of mind in political and spiritual matters." In practice, the members of the Front, like their counterparts in other Communist states, are largely subservient to the Communist Party, and must accept the party's "leading role" as a condition of their existence.

Many of the government's social programs are conducted through the Front. Recently, it has been given a role in programs to reduce poverty. The Front is also responsible for much of the government's policy on religion, and has the ability to determine which religious groups will receive official approval.

Perhaps more importantly, the Front is intended to supervise the activity of the government and of government organisations. Because the Front's power base is mass participation and popular mobilisation, it is seen as representative of the people, and both Vietnam's constitution and laws give it a special role. The Front has a particularly significant role in elections. Specifically, endorsement by the Front is generally required (in practice, if not in theory) to be a candidate for election. Almost all candidates are nominated by (and members of) the Front, with only a few "self-nominated" candidates avoiding the Front's veto. The Front's role in electoral nominations is mandated by law.

Leadership 
Secretary General of the Vietnamese Fatherland Front since 1977:
 Nguyễn Văn Tiến (1977–1988)
 Phạm Văn Kiết (1988–1994)
 Trần Văn Đăng (1994–2004)
 Huỳnh Đảm (2004–2008)
 Vũ Trọng Kim (2008–2016)
 Trần Thanh Mẫn (from 2016)

Chairman of the Vietnamese Fatherland Front since 1977:
 Hoàng Quốc Việt (1977–1983)
 Huỳnh Tấn Phát (1983–1988)
 Nguyễn Hữu Thọ (1988–1994)
 Lê Quang Đạo (1994–1999)
 Phạm Thế Duyệt (1999–2008)
 Huỳnh Đảm (2008–2013)
 Nguyễn Thiện Nhân (2013–2017)
 Trần Thanh Mẫn (from 2017)

Former Front organisations 

 League for the Independence of Vietnam (Việt Minh) founded by Hồ Chí Minh on 19 May 1941.
 Vietnamese National Popular League (Hội Liên hiệp Quốc dân Việt Nam or Liên Việt), founded on 29 May 1946. Head of the League: Huỳnh Thúc Kháng (1946–1947), Bùi Bằng Đoàn (1947–1951). 
 Vietnamese National Popular Front (Mặt trận Liên Việt), founded in 1951, merger of Viet Minh and Lien Viet. Chairman: Tôn Đức Thắng.
 Vietnamese Fatherland Front (Mặt trận Tổ quốc Việt Nam), founded in 1955 and replaced the Vietnamese National Popular Front. Chairman: Tôn Đức Thắng.
 National Liberation Front of South Vietnam (Việt Cộng), founded on 20 December 1960. Chairman: Nguyễn Hữu Thọ.
 Alliance of National, Democratic and Peace Forces of Viet Nam, founded on 20 April 1968. Chairman: Trịnh Đình Thảo.

Electoral history

National Assembly elections

References

External links
 (in Vietnamese)
Third Congress of the Viet Nam Fatherland Front (Documents), held in December 1971

1977 establishments in Vietnam
Communist Party of Vietnam
Political parties established in 1977
Political party alliances in Vietnam
Popular fronts of communist states